The discography of industrial hip-hop group Tackhead consists of four studio albums, four compilation albums, twelve singles and one remix album.

Albums

Studio albums

Compilation albums

Remix albums

Singles

Music videos

References

External links
 Official website
 Tackhead at AllMusic
 
 

Discography
Discographies of American artists
Hip hop discographies